The Silence of the Hams (Italian: Il Silenzio dei Prosciutti) is a 1994 comedy thriller film written by, directed by, and starring Italian comedian Ezio Greggio. It is a parody of many popular thriller and horror films, notably The Silence of the Lambs and Psycho. Along with Greggio, it features an ensemble cast of Dom DeLuise, Billy Zane, Joanna Pacuła, Charlene Tilton and Martin Balsam.

Like many of its contemporary satires (including The Naked Gun), it is largely driven by wordplay, sight gags, running jokes, and references to popular culture of the time (such as Michael Jackson's Thriller) and tongue-in-cheek references to then-current American politics (such as a fight scene between Presidents George H. W. Bush and Bill Clinton). Mel Brooks, who made a number of well regarded parodies (Blazing Saddles, Young Frankenstein, Spaceballs), makes a cameo appearance.

Plot
The film follows rookie detective Jo Dee Fostar (Billy Zane) on his first case: apprehending a serial killer wanted for over 120 murders. To find the killer, Fostar enlists the help of convicted murderer Dr. Animal Cannibal Pizza (Deluise). During the investigation, Fostar's girlfriend, Jane Wine (Charlene Tilton) is asked by her boss to take a large sum of money to the bank; instead, she leaves town with the money. She decides to hide out at the Cemetery Motel, which is revealed to be a cemetery named Motel after its owner, Antonio Motel (Greggio). Jo must then enlist the help of Det. Balsam (Balsam) and Dr. Pizza to find not only the murderer, but his missing girlfriend. This takes the cast on many adventures at the Cemetery Motel. In the final confrontation, most of the characters are revealed to be other people in disguise.

Cast
Ezio Greggio as Antonio Motel
Dom DeLuise as Dr. Animal Cannibal Pizza
Billy Zane as Jo Dee Fostar
Joanna Pacuła as Lily Wine
Charlene Tilton as Jane Wine
Martin Balsam as Det. Martin Balsam
Stuart Pankin as Insp. Pete Putrid
John Astin as The Ranger
Tony Cox as Jail Guard
Mel Brooks as Checkout Guest (uncredited)
Phyllis Diller as Old Secretary
Shelley Winters as Mrs. Motel (The Mother)
Bubba Smith as Olaf
Larry Storch as Sergeant
Rip Taylor as Mr. Laurel
John Carpenter as Trench Coat Man
Eddie Deezen as Cameraman
Pat Rick as Bill Clinton

Critical response
The Silence of the Hams was widely panned by critics and has a 0% "rotten" rating on review aggregate Rotten Tomatoes based on eight reviews.

Time Out London called it a "wholly redundant exercise", while Empire criticised it for "a script staggeringly bereft of humour or invention, and a clumsy, amateurish direction that seems largely concerned with focusing on Charlene Tilton's breasts".

References

External links 
 
 The Silence of the Hams at Rotten Tomatoes
 

1994 films
1990s parody films
1994 independent films
American independent films
American parody films
American satirical films
Italian comedy films
Italian parody films
Italian satirical films
English-language Italian films
Films directed by Ezio Greggio
Films set in the United States
Films produced by Julie Corman
Cultural depictions of George H. W. Bush
Cultural depictions of Bill Clinton
Parodies of horror
Hannibal Lecter (franchise)
1994 comedy films
1990s English-language films
1990s American films